Clifton Incline may refer to:

Clifton Incline (Niagara Falls)
Clifton Incline (Pittsburgh)

See also
Clifton (disambiguation)